Duggan is a village and municipality in Kathua district of the Indian union territory of Jammu and Kashmir. The town is located 170 kilometres from the district headquarters Kathua.

Demographics
According to the 2011 census of India, Duggan has 275 households. The literacy rate of Duggan village was 50.40% compared to 67.16% of Jammu and Kashmir. In Duggan, Male literacy stands at 65.14% while the female literacy rate was 34.44%.

Transportation

Road
Duggan is not directly connected by road. In order to travel from Kathua to Duggan, one has to travel by the Bani-Basoli Road, NH 44 and then walk for some time.

Rail
The nearest major railway station to Duggan is Jammu Tawi railway station located at a distance of 245 kilometres respectively.

Air
The nearest airport to Gundna is Jammu Airport located at a distance of 245 kilometres and is a 7-hour drive.

See also
Jammu and Kashmir
Kathua district
Kathua

References

Villages in Bani tehsil